The Wells graph is the unique distance-regular graph
with intersection array .
.

Its spectrum is
. Its queue number is 3 and its upper bound on the book thickness is 5.

References

External links
 A.E. Brouwer's website: The Armanios-Wells graph

Individual graphs
Regular graphs